Marvin Hart (September 16, 1876 – September 17, 1931) was the World Heavyweight Boxing Champion from July 3, 1905, to February 23, 1906.

Boxing career 
Hart, nicknamed "The Louisville Plumber" because of his former trade, gained considerable prominence after a 1905 win over future champion Jack Johnson. That year, the heavyweight title was left vacant as a result of the retirement of champion James J. Jeffries and Hart's record earned him a chance to fight for the championship against top-ranked Jack Root (1876–1963), a much more experienced boxer, who had already beaten Hart in November, 1902.

Jeffries, the retiring champ, refereed the championship fight on July 3, 1905, in Reno, Nevada.  Hart knocked out Jack Root in the 12th round to win the vacant championship. After one successful exhibition match, Hart lost his championship to Canadian Tommy Burns on February 23, 1906, in Los Angeles.  Burns won the 20-round fight by decision.

Death 
Hart died the day after his 55th birthday of an enlarged liver and high blood pressure. He was interred in the Resthaven Memorial Park, in his hometown of Louisville, Kentucky.

Professional boxing record

See also
List of heavyweight boxing champions

References

External links 
 Marvin Hart - Cyber Boxing Zone Profile
 
 

1876 births
1931 deaths
Boxers from Louisville, Kentucky
Heavyweight boxers
World heavyweight boxing champions
American male boxers